Liroceras is a genus of nautiloid cephalopod. It is the type genus of the clydonautiliacean family, Liroceratidae, and is characterized by a rapidly expanding, subglobular, nautiliconic shell with a reniform whorl section, small umbilicus, essentially straight sutures, and a siphuncle with a variable but not marginal position.

Liroceras has a temporal range from the Mississippian to the Permian period, the longest of the Liroceratidae. It has been found in North America, Europe, China and the East Indies. A similar genus, Condraoceras, differs in having a circular cross section and shallow ventral and lateral lobes. Another, Bistrialites, also has a reniform whorl section but differs in having a large funnel-shaped umbilicus.

References

Nautiloids
Mississippian first appearances
Permian genus extinctions
Paleozoic life of Yukon